The Central Bureau of Investigation and Statistics (CBIS) ), commonly known as Zhongtong, was an intelligence unit under the Central Executive Committee of the Kuomintang. It was one of Chiang Kai-shek's two police and military intelligence agencies, the other being the Military Bureau of Investigation and Statistics headed by Dai Li from 1929 until his death in 1946. The CBIS focused on civilian intelligence, while the MBIS targeted military activities.

The CBIS bureau was largely superseded by the Ministry of Justice Investigation Bureau in Taiwan after 1949.

History
The previous body of CBIS had its origin in the CC Clique, which was founded in 1927 as a secret spying agency.

In 1931, Chen Lifu was appointed the head of the Kuomintang's Organization Department and he set up the intelligence unit.

In 1935, this intelligence body was re-organized as the Central Bureau of Investigation and Statistics.

See also
 Ministry of Justice Investigation Bureau
 National Security Bureau (Taiwan)
 Bureau of Investigation and Statistics
 Republic of China (1912–1949)
 Kuomintang

References

Warlord cliques in Republican China
Taiwanese intelligence agencies
Defunct intelligence agencies